The Fourth Football League Rijeka or Četvrta nogometna liga Rijeka (Croatian), or simply 4. NL Rijeka, is a fifth tier league competition in the Croatian football league system. The league was formed in 2014, after two divisions of 3. HNL were merged into a new 3. HNL West, resulting in relegation of numerous clubs. The league covers clubs from Istria County, Primorje-Gorski Kotar County and Lika-Senj county.

Members for season 2022–23

List of winners

External links
Sportcom

5
2014 establishments in Croatia
Croa